is a national highway connecting Ashikaga, Tochigi and Iruma, Saitama in Japan, with a total length of 60.4 km (37.53 mi).

References

National highways in Japan
Roads in Gunma Prefecture
Roads in Saitama Prefecture
Roads in Tochigi Prefecture